Giovanni Battista Ragazzini (circa 1520 - circa 1591) was an Italian painter, active in Ravenna, Fano, and in Umbria. He was born in Ravenna. He painted with his brother Francesco in the church of San Domenico, Fano. His style was influenced by Luca Longhi. A painting of Mary Magdalene is in Santa Maria delle Vergini, Macerata.

References

External links 
Ragazzini Giovanni Battista/ Ragazzini Francesco, Santa Maria Maddalena

Italian Renaissance painters
16th-century Italian painters
Italian male painters
1520 births
1591 deaths
People from Ravenna